Wineman is a surname. Notable people with the surname include:

Alexis Wineman (born 1994), American beauty pageant titleholder and autism advocate
 Danielle Wineman (born 1991 or 1992), American actress and beauty pageant titleholder, sister of Alexis
Vivian Wineman, British lawyer and Jewish community activist

See also
Bangs-Wineman Block
Wineman's, a former Southern California department store chain